Conical hill is a landform with a distinctly conical shape.

Conical hill may also refer to:

 Cone Hill, a hill on Hut Point Peninsula, in Ross Island, Antarctica.
 Conical Hill, Antarctica is a rock hill on the southern slopes of Mount Terror on Ross Island, Antarctica.
 Conical Hill, Sri Lanka, a mountain in the Nuwara Eliya District of Sri Lanka.
 Conical Hill, a hill on the Tapanui Branch railway line in New Zealand.